Elachista michelseni is a moth in the family Elachistidae. It was described by Traugott-Olsen in 1992. It is found in Tunisia.

References

Moths described in 1992
michelseni
Moths of Africa